Jake Neighbours (born March 29, 2002) is a Canadian professional ice hockey left winger who currently plays for the  St. Louis Blues of the National Hockey League (NHL). He was drafted by the Blues in the first round of the 2020 NHL Entry Draft with the 26th overall pick.

Early life
Neighbours was born on March 29, 2002, in Airdrie, Alberta, Canada. When praised for his maturity, he cites the wide age gap between his half and step-siblings as the reason. In an interview, he said "once you get to the age of 10 or 11 and your brothers are 14 years older than you, your brothers don't want to hang out with you anymore if you're going to be an annoying kid. So I've learned from a young age to be mature and relaxed so my brothers would want me around."

Playing career
Growing up in Alberta, Neighbours competed with the Calgary Midget AAA Buffaloes of the Alberta Midget AAA Hockey League and Airdrie Xtreme in the Alberta Major Bantam Hockey League. He transferred from the Xtreme to the Kelowna Pursuit of Excellence Bantam Prep team before being drafted fourth overall pick in the 2017 Western Hockey League (WHL) bantam draft by the Edmonton Oil Kings. During his draft-eligible year, Neighbours recorded 68 points in 30 regular-season games and 11 points in the playoffs. 

Neighbours joined the Oil Kings for their 2018–19 season, recording 24 points in 47 regular-season games and earning two WHL Rookie of the Month awards. His play helped push the Oil Kings into the post-season, where he was the team's only rookie to score during the playoffs. After returning from a loss with Canada White, Neighbours suffered an upper-body injury during a fight against a Red Deer Rebels player and was forced to sit out for 12 games. Upon returning to the lineup in February, he was given a five-minute major for boarding and game misconduct, followed by a four-game suspension. In his sophomore season with the Oil Kings, Neighbours averaged more than one point per game, tallying 70 points in 64 regular-season games before the WHL season was halted due to the COVID-19 pandemic. Prior to the pause in the season, he was invited to participate at the CHL/NHL Top Prospects Game and was ranked 30th amongst all North American Skaters by the NHL Central Scouting Bureau's Midterm Draft Rankings. He was also the recipient of teams' Most Improved Player Award and Scholastic Award, having previously named to the league's named to WHL Academic Spotlight for December as a student at Salisbury Composite High School.

Leading up to the 2020 NHL Entry Draft, Neighbours was ranked 26th among North American skaters, a boost from his previous rank of 30. He was eventually drafted in the first round, 26th overall, of the 2020 NHL Draft by the St. Louis Blues. Neighbours began the 2020–21 season with signing a three-year entry-level contract with the Blues on October 17, 2020. He attended the Blues' training camp but was re-assigned to their American Hockey League (AHL) affiliate, the Utica Comets, to begin the season as he is eligible to be on the AHL roster until his junior season starts.

Neighbours made the Blues opening night roster for the 2021–22 season and made his NHL debut on October 16, 2021 at Ball Arena against the Colorado Avalanche where the Blues won 5–3 and Neighbours registered 9:00 minutes of ice time, three hits, and one shot on goal. In his second game against the Arizona Coyotes on October 18, 2021, Neighbours recorded his first NHL point as he recorded the primary assist after making a nifty play behind the net and dishing it to Klim Kostin who would score a goal which wound up as the game winning goal in a Blues 7–4 victory. In the second period of his fourth game against the Los Angeles Kings, Neighbours received a pass from Brayden Schenn and put the puck passed Kings goalie Cal Petersen to score his first career NHL goal. The goal made it 4–1 Blues and they ended up winning the game 7–3, meaning Neighbours’ goal was the game winning goal. 

After playing the first nine games of the Blues season, Neighbours was sent back to the WHL to return to the Edmonton Oil Kings. During the 2021–22 WHL season, Neighbours recorded 17 goals and 28 assists in 30 regular season games along with three goals and 14 assists in 19 playoff games as the Oil Kings eventually defeated the Seattle Thunderbirds in six games to win the Ed Chynoweth Cup.

International play
On October 16, 2018, Neighbours and Oil Kings teammate Sebastian Cossa were two of 66 players selected to represent Canada at the 2018 World U-17 Hockey Challenge. Prior to the start of the tournament, Neighbours named captain of Canada White while Kaiden Guhle of the Prince Albert Raiders was selected to lead Canada Red. The following year, Neighbours was named to the Canada men's national junior ice hockey team for the 2019 Hlinka Gretzky Cup, where he helped them win a silver medal.

Career statistics

Regular season and playoffs

International

References

External links

2002 births
Living people
Canadian ice hockey left wingers
Edmonton Oil Kings players
National Hockey League first-round draft picks
People from Airdrie, Alberta
St. Louis Blues draft picks
St. Louis Blues players
Springfield Thunderbirds players